The 30 mm Type 5 cannon was a Japanese Navy autocannon used near the end of World War II. It was an indigenous 30 mm design with better performance than the Navy's earlier Oerlikon-derived Type 2 or the Imperial Army's Browning-derived Ho-155, although it was considerably heavier. The Type 5 was to have become the standard fighter cannon of the Japanese Navy – four would have been mounted on the J7W Shinden – but by the end of the war had seen use on only a few aircraft, including variants of the Mitsubishi J2M and Yokosuka P1Y.

Specifications
Caliber: 30 mm (1.2 in)
Ammunition: 30 × 122 (345 g)
Weight: 70 kg (155 lb)
Rate of fire: 350 rounds/min

Cannon was constructed by engineer Masaya Kawamura, in Nihon Tokushu-Ko KK, and produced in Navy factories in Toyokawa and also in small numbers KK Nihon Seikojo and Nihon Tokushu-Ko KK.

See also 
Type 2 cannon
Type 99 cannon
Ho-155 cannon
Ho-105 cannon

References

 Gustin Emmanuel, The WWII Fighter Gun Debate: Gun Tables  (1999)
 Anthony G. Williams, 30 MM CALIBRE CARTRIDGES

30mm Type 5 cannon
Autocannon
Aircraft guns
World War II weapons of Japan